Tumpat may refer to:
Tumpat District, Kelantan, Malaysia
Tumpat (federal constituency), represented in the Dewan Rakyat
Tumpat FA, football team based in Kota Bharu, Kelantan